Stephen Mizerak Jr. (October 12, 1944 – May 29, 2006), better known as Steve Mizerak, was an American pool player, who was born in Perth Amboy, New Jersey. Mizerak is considered one of the best straight pool players of all time, dominant in the game during the 1970s, winning over 70 tournament in his career. Mizerak won the World Straight Pool Championship twice, including a record 4 consecutive BCA U.S. Open Straight Pool Championship titles. Nicknamed "The Miz", he had a high run of 421 balls.

Career 
Mizerak, a lefty, began playing pool under the guidance of his father, who for many years had been the New Jersey State Champion. Mizerak's father opened a pool hall in Metuchen. There, Mizerak played billiards for the first time at the age of 4. At the age of 5, Mizerak trained for hours every day before doing his first exhibitions at the age of 6. By the age of 11 he had already run 50 balls at straight pool, and 100 by the age of 13. At 15 he won the Perth Amboy City Championship. The next year he was refused entry into that event; they said he was too good. Numerous observers and players predicted a golden future for Mizerak, and he was already being compared to Willie Mosconi.
In 1965 when Mizerak was 20 years old he qualified for the World Straight Pool Championship, where he shocked the pool world by defeating top players like Irving Crane, Luther Lassiter, and Joe Balsis. The 1960s saw a decline for the World Straight Pool Championship, as the era of the Hustlers in the Johnston City Championship was growing. By this point in his life Mizerak decided it would not be possible to earn a living playing pool full time and went on to attend Athens College in Athens, Alabama.
After some time at Saint Ambrose University in Davenport, Iowa, Mizerak graduated from Athens College with a degree in education, history, and psychology in 1967. He then took a position as a history and geography teacher at a secondary school in Perth Amboy, New Jersey were he taught for 13 years.

Mizerak became famous outside of pool circles after appearing in a humorous commercial for Miller Lite beer in 1978, in which he executed three complicated shots (which took more than 100 "takes"), then proclaimed that you can "really work up a thirst, even when you're just showing off." Due to his fame as a result of this commercial, in 1980 Mizerak quit his job as a teacher to further promote Miller Lite in billiards demonstrations at trade shows while continuing on the tournament circuit. He did another dozen or so Miller Lite ads over the next decade. 

These advertisements helped popularize pool, and Mizerak himself became well known nationally. He was invited to exhibitions regularly. However, Mizerak struggled in competitions because of his busy schedule of exhibitions promoting Miller Lite. Mizerak by this time had established himself as one of the best players in the world winning the BCA U.S. Open Straight Pool Championship four years in a row, a record which still stands. 
In 1979 Mizerak once again proved his dominance by winning the U.S. Open 9-ball Championship, defeating Jim Rempe in the finals and going undefeated in the tournament. In the 1970s Mizerak had 40 professional tournament victories, more that any other player that decade. Due to this Mizerak was inducted into the Billiard Congress of America Hall of Fame in 1980. At the time Mizerak was the youngest player ever to receive this honour.

In the 1980s, Mizerak was still very active as an advertising face, which is why he was able to focus on the actual game to a limited extent. In 1986 he had a guest role in the film The Color of Money. Mizerak won back-to-back World Straight Pool Championship titles in 1982 and 1983, and multiple Nine-ball tournaments throughout the 1980s. After that, however, in the 90s weight problems prevented him from winning other big titles, even though he continued to actively play in tournaments and winning smaller events. He reached a major final in 1989 and was his 5th final of the U.S. Open Straight Pool Championship although falling short to German champion Oliver Ortmann. 
In the mid 90s Mizerak had settled in Florida were he founded the senior tour for professional billiards players in 1996. He owned a Florida-based company that sold billiards equipment, ran a billiards parlor in Lake Park, Fla., and wrote instructional books, one of them titled "Just Showin' Off."

Snooker
In 1978, Mizerak becoming the first American-born player to compete in a professional Snooker event. He competed in the 1978 Canadian Open, Mizerak won his first match, including an 81 break, but lost to  Tony Knowles by 9 frames to 7.

Mizerak also played in a series of snooker and pool challenge matches from 1974 to 1990 – rare televised examples of Mizerak playing snooker – against the top snooker players in the world, John Spencer, Steve Davis, Jimmy White, Joe Johnson and Stephen Hendry. The competition's were a best of Snooker & various Pool games, this meant that Mizerak was a slight favourite due to his opponents unfamiliarity with Pool and his slight knowledge of Snooker. 

In 1974, Mizerak competed against John Spencer in Snooker and Straight Pool. He won all 3 frames of Straight Pool and unexpectedly won 2 of the 3 frames in Snooker, to win the overall competition. 

In 1987 Mizerak competed against Steve Davis, this time in Snooker, Straight Pool and Nine-Ball. Despite losing heavily to Davis by 5 frames to 1 in Snooker, Mizerak won both in Straight Pool and Nine-Ball to be the overall winner, which earned him $50,000 for his victory, which was the largest first place prize a pool player had won at the time. In the following years, he competed against Jimmy White in 1988, Joe Johnson in 1989 and Stephen Hendry in 1990. Mizerak again lost against all three opponents in Snooker but won both in Straight Pool and Eight-Ball, to be undefeated in the overall title.

Mizerak turned professional in 1988 and competed in the World Snooker Championship in 1988 and 1989, but failed to progress beyond the first round of qualifying on both occasions, losing to low-ranked snooker professionals. In 1988, he lost 10 frames to 2 to Anthony Harris, and the following year was beaten by 10 frames to 1 by Mark Rowling, before giving up on his snooker ambitions.

Later life 
Mizerak owned and operated pool halls in the West Palm Beach-Lake Park, Florida area during the 1990s and 2000s. He founded the Senior Tour in 1996 for players over 50, which held around 5 or 6 tournaments a year, and offered guaranteed prize money of $25,000 to $50,000. The tour's home was at a billiard hall he opened in Lake Park called Steve Mizerak's Billiards. 

Mizerak suffered from obesity for the later part of his adult life, weighing over 400 lbs by the end of his career. Mizerak suffered a stroke in 2001 at the age of 56 which left him with physical challenges that prevented him from playing pool competitively, subsequently retiring in 2001. 

in 1999 he was ranked number 6 among the Billiards Digest "50 Greatest Players of the Century" and ranked 2nd "Greatest Living Player of the Century".

Death
Mizerak died on May 29, 2006, at the age of 61 due to complications stemming from gall bladder surgery.  He is survived by his wife Karen, two sons, and two grandchildren.

Career titles

Filmography

 1978 Miller Lite Beer Commercial 
 1980 The Baltimore Bullet 
 1984 Late Night with David Letterman
 1986 The Color of Money
 1989 Pool The Masters Way 
 1994 Pocket Billiards Fundamentals To Fantasticks 
 2000 The Art of Billiards

References

"Legendary pool player Steve 'The Miz' Mizerak dies", USA Today, May 30, 2006 (retrieved May 31, 2006)
"Pool's Biggest Showoff" , July 2006 article on Mizerak, in Billiards Digest

External links
"Steve Mizerak: 2000 Year in Review" – the final page of results and statistics for this player available at AZBilliards.com: The A to Z of Billiards and Pool (with links to previous years)

1944 births
2006 deaths
American pool players
American snooker players
People from Perth Amboy, New Jersey
Perth Amboy High School alumni